Strawberry Peak is a prominent peak in the San Gabriel Mountains of Los Angeles County, California. Strawberry Peak is the tallest of the front range peaks, being three feet higher than nearby San Gabriel Peak. Both can be widely seen from greater Los Angeles and the San Gabriel Valley, and are popular with hikers. Other prominent nearby peaks include Josephine Peak and Mount Wilson. Strawberry Peak was named by mountaineers over a century ago, who felt the peak resembled an enormous upside-down strawberry.

The peak can be ascended on the east side as a 7.2-mile round-trip trail walk using Strawberry Peak Trail, which begins near the Red Box Picnic Area, or from the west as a class 3 scramble from a trailhead near the entrance to the Switzer Picnic Site.

The area was closed to the public as a result of the Station Fire.  However, the last closure order expired on May 24, 2014.  Remaining fire damage in the area is minimal.

It is especially common to see Rattlesnakes in the area.

References 

Mountains of Los Angeles County, California
San Gabriel Mountains
Mountains of Southern California